Barguzin may refer to:
Barguzin (river), a river in Buryatia, Russia
Barguzin Range
Barguzin Nature Reserve
Barguzin (rural locality), a rural locality (a selo) in the Republic of Buryatia, Russia
Barguzin class hovercraft
BZhRK Barguzin, Russian railway-based intercontinental ballistic missile.

See also
Ust-Barguzin, an urban locality (an urban-type settlement) in the Republic of Buryatia, Russia